Jason Moss may refer to:

 Jason Moss (writer) (1975–2006), American writer on serial killers
 Jason Moss (musician) (born 1969), American musician